Antonio Moreno Sánchez (born 13 February 1983 in Puerto Real, Province of Cádiz) is a Spanish former professional footballer who played as a right-back.

External links

1983 births
Living people
People from Puerto Real
Sportspeople from the Province of Cádiz
Spanish footballers
Footballers from Andalusia
Association football defenders
La Liga players
Segunda División players
Segunda División B players
Tercera División players
Divisiones Regionales de Fútbol players
Atlético Madrid C players
Atlético Madrid B players
Atlético Madrid footballers
Mérida UD footballers
CD Guadalajara (Spain) footballers
Cultural Leonesa footballers
Atlético Sanluqueño CF players
CD Guijuelo footballers
Xerez Deportivo FC footballers
Liga I players
CSM Ceahlăul Piatra Neamț players
Spanish expatriate footballers
Expatriate footballers in Romania
Spanish expatriate sportspeople in Romania